Quentin Durward Neill (16 April 1866 – 9 August 1901) was a Scottish footballer who made 59 appearances in the Football League for Lincoln City. He played as a right back. Before moving to England he played for Queen's Park in Scotland.

Life and career
Neill was born in Glasgow, he was younger brother to Robert W. Neill who went on to captain Scotland in 1880. He played football for Queen's Park before moving to England where he joined Lincoln City. He made his debut in December 1888 in the Combination, and played regularly over the next six years as the club won the Midland League title in its inaugural season, played in the Football Alliance, and was invited to join the newly formed Second Division of the Football League. He scored three goals, two in the Midland League and one in the FA Cup.

The 1891 Census records Neill working as an accountant and lodging in the St Botolph's parish of Lincoln, in the household of former Lincoln City footballer Jack Strawson, also an accountant.

Neill had a benefit match in 1895 against Burnley and by the end of the year he had emigrated to South Africa to set up business, and when the Boer War broke out he became a Trooper with the Driscoll's Scouts. Neill died in 1901, in a Durban hospital due to a fever.

Notes

References

1866 births
1901 deaths
Footballers from Glasgow
Scottish footballers
Association football fullbacks
Queen's Park F.C. players
Lincoln City F.C. players
Midland Football League players
English Football League players
British Army personnel of the Second Boer War
British military personnel killed in the Second Boer War